Piz Alpetta is a mountain of the Swiss Lepontine Alps, located south of Tschamut in the canton of Graubünden. It lies north of Piz Ravetsch, on the range between the Val Maighels and the Val Curnera.

References

External links
 Piz Alpetta on Hikr

Mountains of the Alps
Mountains of Switzerland
Mountains of Graubünden
Lepontine Alps
Two-thousanders of Switzerland
Tujetsch